The Jakarta ePrix is an annual race of the single-seater, electrically powered Formula E championship, which is held in Jakarta, Indonesia. It is the first FIA-sanctioned race in the country since the A1 GP Grand Prix of Nations race in Sentul in 2006 and the first ever motor racing event to be administered directly by the FIA. 

The plan to include Jakarta as part of the 2020 Formula E Championship was conceived in Monaco in April 2019, and discussed in New York City in July 2019. In August, the decision was made and the event was officially announced in September 2019, with Jakarta originally intended to hold the event for five consecutive years starting from 2020. It was supposed to have been first held in the 2019–20 season, on 6 June 2020; the race was cancelled as a result of the COVID-19 pandemic.

On 15 October 2021, it was announced that the race would be the ninth round of 2021–22 Formula E World Championship, becoming the first ePrix in Indonesia and the fourth Asian country to host an ePrix, following China (including Hong Kong), Malaysia, and Saudi Arabia. The event and its planning has been surrounded by several controversies, such as high commitment fees and location uncertainty.

Circuit
The original circuit was initially to be situated around the National Monument and the Merdeka Square, both in Central Jakarta. The announcement of the location was delayed until January 2022, from the original schedule of December 2021. The executive director of the Center of Youth and Population Research (CYPR), Dedek Prayudi, commented that the 2022 Jakarta ePrix could have been potentially delayed or cancelled as a result of location uncertainty.

Eventually, the location of the circuit would be announced in 23 December according to the main director of PT Jakarta Propertindo (Jakpro), Widi Amanasto. The event's chief organizer, Ahmad Sahroni, said that only two left from all five options for the circuit's location, Ancol or JIEXPO Kemayoran. On 22 December, following multiple postponements, Ancol was selected as the location for the race.

Ancol's location as the race in Ancol caused controversies, due to it being constructed at a mud dump that was used during the previous governorships of Joko Widodo and Basuki Tjahaja Purnama. While the Indonesian Democratic Party of Struggle (PDI-P) opposed tree logging at the location, the main director of Jakpro, Widi Amanasto said that the trees would not be cut down, but instead be relocated. Jakarta's vice governor, Ahmad Riza Patria, said that the race is not supposed to be held on the swamps.

Fees

Corruption Eradication Commission (KPK) cited high commitment fees paid to the Jakarta government for the Jakarta ePrix. Also according to the government regulation number 19 of 2019 concerning Regional Finance Managements, in article 98 paragraph (6); funding of activities for multiple years shall not exceed the end of office, except for national priorities and strategic affairs, as the governor of Jakarta Anies Baswedan is slated to leave the office in 2022. In response to the high commitment fees, Hardiyanto Kenneth, a member of the Regional People's Representative Council in Jakarta, requested their return.

Interpellation 
In August 2021, the political parties Indonesian Democratic Party of Struggle and Indonesian Solidarity Party attempted a failed interpellation of Jakarta ePrix against Anies Baswedan for being introduced into his 2021–2022 regional priorities. According to Prasetio, the event will potentially burden future governors after Anies leaves the office.

Tender failure 
As of 24 January 2022, the tender to construct the circuit was declared failed according to the e-procurement site of PT Jakpro. A member of Jakarta Regional People's Representative Council, Gembong Warsono, alleged an intentional tender failure to enable PT Jakpro to select contractors directly. Despite the failure of the tender, it was later announced on 5 February that PT Jaya Konstruksi Manggala Pratama won the tender.

Accident 
On 27 May 2022, the grandstand roof at the Ancol circuit collapsed due to strong winds. On 4 June 2022, a portion of the circuit was on fire.

Results

See also
 Electric motorsport
 Extreme E
 List of Formula E drivers
 List of Formula E ePrix

References

Jakarta
Auto races in Indonesia
Sports competitions in Jakarta
Recurring sporting events established in 2022
2022 establishments in Indonesia